Bradford School was a private for-profit college in Pittsburgh, Pennsylvania.  Bradford awarded both diplomas and specialized associate degrees.

After 50 years of operations, Bradford School announced that it would no longer enroll new students as of June 2018 at its Pittsburgh location due to declining enrollment and changes to the area that impacted operations. Career Services for graduates and alumni ceased April 30, 2019.

Student body, admissions, and outcomes

According to Peterson’s and recent institutional publications, Bradford School had an undergraduate population of 387. For the most recent year, 68% of entering students graduated and 86% of all graduates were placed in jobs.

Academics

Bradford grouped its twelve major areas of study into three main categories: Business, Technology, and Health Care.

Accreditation

Bradford School was accredited by the Accrediting Commission of Career Schools and Colleges to award diplomas and associate degrees. The Medical Assisting Program was accredited by the Commission on Accreditation of Allied Health Education Programs (CAAHEP). The Dental Assisting program is accredited by the Commission on Dental Accreditation of the American Dental Association.

References

External links
 

Graphic design schools in the United States
Former for-profit universities and colleges in the United States
Universities and colleges in Pittsburgh
Educational institutions disestablished in 2018